Ruslan bin Muharam (born 4 November 1963) is a Malaysian politician from PBS. He has been the Member of Sabah State Legislative Assembly for Lumadan since 2020.

Education 
He obtained a Master's Degree in Political Science from UTM.

Politics 
Ruslan has been the Vice President of PBS since 2003 and Chief of PBS Sipitang Division since 1999.

Election result

Honours 
  :
  Medal of the Order of the Defender of the Realm (PPN) (2005)
  Companion of the Order of the Defender of the Realm (JMN) (2017)
  :
  Commander of the Order of Kinabalu (PGDK) – Datuk (2022)

References 

Malaysian politicians
21st-century Malaysian politicians
Malaysian Muslims
People from Sabah
United Sabah Party politicians
Members of the Sabah State Legislative Assembly
Living people
1963 births
Commanders of the Order of Kinabalu
Medallists of the Order of the Defender of the Realm
Kadazan-Dusun people
Companions of the Order of the Defender of the Realm